Martin Ande (born 12 April 1948) is a Nigerian long-distance runner. He competed in the marathon at the 1968 Summer Olympics.

References

External links

1948 births
Living people
Athletes (track and field) at the 1968 Summer Olympics
Nigerian male long-distance runners
Nigerian male marathon runners
Olympic athletes of Nigeria
Place of birth missing (living people)